Lachlan and Lower Darling was an electoral district of the Legislative Assembly in the Australian state of New South Wales. It existed between 1856 and 1859, and was named after the Lachlan and Darling Rivers. It elected two members simultaneously. In 1859 it was replaced by Lachlan.

Members for Lachlan and Lower Darling

Election results

1856

1858

References

Lachlan and Lower Darling
Lachlan and Lower Darling
History of Queensland
Constituencies established in 1856
Constituencies disestablished in 1859
1856 establishments in Australia
1859 disestablishments in Australia